Carry Loose is the eponymous debut studio album from Japanese girl group Carry Loose. It was released on October 22, 2019, by T-Palette Records. The album consists of thirteen tracks including the title track, "Carry Loose".

Track listing

Charts

References

2019 debut albums
Japanese-language albums